Karl Ignatius Lorinser (1796–1853) was an Austrian physician.

External link

1796 births
1853 deaths
19th-century Austrian physicians